Players and pairs who neither have high enough rankings nor receive wild cards may participate in a qualifying tournament held one week before the annual Wimbledon Tennis Championships.

Seeds

  Emmanuelle Derly (first round)
  Sabine Auer (first round)
  Donna Faber (second round)
  Jana Pospíšilová (second round)
  Cathy Caverzasio (first round)
  Veronika Martinek (first round)
  Kumiko Okamoto (qualified)
  Anna-Maria Fernandez (first round)
  Pilar Vásquez (first round)
  Penny Barg (qualified)
  Cammy MacGregor (first round)
  Ronni Reis (qualified)
  Julie Richardson (first round)
  Louise Field (qualified)
  Lisa O'Neill (qualifying competition, Lucky loser)
  Tina Mochizuki (first round)

Qualifiers

  Ronni Reis
  Penny Barg
  Lise Gregory
  Jo-Anne Faull
  Karen Hunter
  Louise Field
  Kumiko Okamoto
  Sandy Collins

Lucky losers

  Lisa O'Neill
  Karine Quentrec
  Shaun Stafford

Qualifying draw

First qualifier

Second qualifier

Third qualifier

Fourth qualifier

Fifth qualifier

Sixth qualifier

Seventh qualifier

Eighth qualifier

External links

1988 Wimbledon Championships on WTAtennis.com
1988 Wimbledon Championships – Women's draws and results at the International Tennis Federation

Women's Singles Qualifying
Wimbledon Championship by year – Women's singles qualifying
Wimbledon Championships